T. H. Marshall's social citizenship is a political concept first highlighted in his essay, “Citizenship and the Social Class” in 1949.

Overview 
Marshall's concept defines the social responsibilities the state has to its citizens or, as Marshall puts it, “from [granting] the right to a modicum of economic welfare and security to the right to share to the full in the social heritage and to live the life of a civilized being according to the standards prevailing in the society”. One of the key points made by Marshall is his belief in an evolution of rights in England acquired via citizenship, from “civil rights in the eighteenth [century], political in the nineteenth, and social in the twentieth”.  This evolution however, has been criticized by many for only being from the perspective of the white working man. Marshall concludes his essay with three major factors for the evolution of social rights and for their further evolution, listed below: 
 The lessening of the income gap
 “The great extension of the area of common culture and common experience”
 An enlargement of citizenship and more rights granted to these citizens. 
Many of the social responsibilities of a state have since become a major part of many state’s policies (see United States Social Security). However, these have also become controversial issues as there is a debate over whether a citizen truly has the right to education and even more so, to social welfare.

Criticism

From neo-liberals
“Neo-Liberal (Free-Market) ideology [asserts] that state abstention from economic protection is the foundation of a good society”, thus they are diametrically opposed to the social rights proposed by Marshall. Neo-liberals instead suggest that welfare programs (some of the social responsibilities discussed by Marshall to help the poor “effectively utilize their civil and political rights”), have “promoted passivity among the poor, without actually improving their chances, and created a culture of dependency”. They instead suggest (and have implemented) welfare requiring fulfillment of obligations.

Proponents of social citizenship are very critical of the Neo-Liberal ideology, suggesting that it is an “assault on the very principle of citizenship”, and that the Neo-Liberal institution of fulfillment of obligations as requirement for citizenship, because they suggest that citizenship is inherent and that “that is only appropriate to demand fulfillment of the responsibilities after the right to participate is achieved”.

From feminists
Some feminist scholars argue that Marshall’s essay only reflects the perspective of working class white males. His assertion that in England all people were free and had civil rights is false, as only men had any “legal freedom” or ability to exercise political or civil rights. Thus, they argue that Marshall fails to discuss the issue of second-class citizens and that “he takes for granted the gender and racial hierarchies”  within society is a fundamental flaw in his work.

However, while Marshall did not discuss the problems associated with having second-class citizenry, he did acknowledge that “citizenship itself [has] functioned as an architect of social inequality”. Additionally, many feminists see the expansion of social rights as an inherently good thing, especially as today; women in many countries have the same civil and political rights as men. And, feminists see social rights as giving an opportunity to many women to utilize their civil and political rights (just as Marshall suggests white men in England in the 1940s are able to do). Especially as current free-market solutions “[embrace’] a racialized, genderized, and class-biased  vision  of  social  equity  and community solidarity that  favors the interests of the most privileged members  of society”. Without resources, traditional hierarchies, with white men at the top, are unable to be combated.

The contract–charity dichotomy 
Nancy Fraser and Linda Gordon in the essay “Contract versus Charity: Why is there no Social Citizenship in the United States?” expanded on T. H. Marshall's original proposition to look at how gender inequality has led to a dismissal of social citizenship within the United States. They argue that, because men were more powerful in civil society, within the “male sphere”  “contractual relations dominated”, especially in regards to work with wage contracts.  Gradually, the male sphere began to dominate more and more of human relations, and thus contractual relations encroached on more and more areas. Because of “the hegemony of contract… a specifically modern conception of ‘charity’”  was generated as a “complementary other.” Thus, welfare and helping the unfortunate became seen as a form of charity, rather than as an obligation. Because of this viewpoint, the receivers of charity were stigmatized for not “earning” the charity. 
	
Fraser and Gordon also offer a solution to allowing social citizenship to gain popularity within the United States. They suggest that concentrating the focus of civil citizenship from “property-centered to a more solidaristic form” would allow citizens to reestablish ties with their community, something they believe is essential for citizens to have in order to believe in welfare and social citizenship as a whole.

Conclusion
T.H. Marshall published his essay in 1949 and it has had a huge impact on many of the citizenship debates which have followed it. Though the original essay fails to view perspectives other than that of a working class white male, social citizenship not only can be but has been applied to myriad peoples. The United States has realized the  failure of social citizenship, but many industrialized states view social citizenship as their responsibility, even providing welfare outside of their own borders. Marshall’s articulation of the idea of social citizenship was vital to the idea’s proliferation.

References 

Civil rights and liberties
Citizenship